The 2017–18 GFF Elite League was the 17th season of the highest competitive football league in Guyana, and the 3rd season of the Elite League. Topp XX and Monedderlust FC who finished the previous season at the bottom of the table, were replaced by Den Amstel FC, Western Tigers FC (Georgetown), Milerock FC (Linden), Ann's Grove United FC, New Amsterdam United FC and Cougars FC (Berbice). 

The season began on the 19 November 2017 and ended on the 21 September 2018 with Cougars in last and automatically related and New Amsterdam United finishing in 9th and entering the relegation playoff. New Amsterdam United would go on to play Soesdyke Falcons, who were champions of the East Bank FA, where the game finished 3-3 before Soesdyke Falcons won 5-4 on penalties, relegating New Amsterdam United.

Standings

Top scorers

References 

GFF Elite League seasons
Guyana
football
football